Noureddin Mustafa Ali al-Atassi (11 January 1929 – 3 December 1992) was President of Syria from February 1966 to November 1970.

Early life and education
Atassi was born in Homs in 1929 to the famous Al Atassi family.

Career
Atassi was a medical doctor by training, and in that capacity aided the Algerian forces against the French in the Algerian War of Independence. A longtime ideologue of the powerful Ba'ath Party Atassi became its General Secretary as well as President of the Republic in 1966. He was considered to be largely a ceremonial figurehead, with real power vested in the Deputy General Secretary, Salah Jadid. In 1970, he was deposed along with Salah Jadid in a coup by Hafez al-Assad, his defense minister.

Arrest and death
Along with other members of the government, al-Atassi was put under arrest without trial following the coup of 1970. Then he was transferred to the Mezze military prison in Damascus where he lived from 1970 to 1992. After 22-year imprisonment, he was released and flown to Paris to receive medical treatment in France on 22 November 1992, and died at a hospital in December 1992.

References

1929 births
1992 deaths
Noureddin
People from Homs
Presidents of Syria
Prime Ministers of Syria
Vice presidents of Syria
Leaders ousted by a coup
Members of the National Command of the Ba'ath Party (Syrian-dominated faction)
Members of the Regional Command of the Arab Socialist Ba'ath Party – Syria Region
Syrian Arab nationalists
Syrian Sunni Muslims
Syrian people of Turkish descent
Heads of government who were later imprisoned